MADA, Mada or variants may refer to:

 Acetyl-S-ACP:malonate ACP transferase (MadA), an enzyme
 Mada, a term from Hindu theology and mythology
 Mada (Buddhism), an unwholesome factor in Buddhism
  Mada, a village in the Balșa commune in Hunedoara County, Transylvania, Romania
 Monash Art, Design and Architecture, a faculty at Monash University, Melbourne, Australia
 MADA Gallery, an exhibition space at the faculty 
 Saudi Payments Network, or mada, the major and only payment system in Saudi Arabia